The Balloon Pilot Badge is a military badge of the United States Armed Forces which was issued during the First and Second World Wars.  The badge was issued by both the United States Army and the U.S. Air Force, with the Navy equivalent known as the Dirigible Pilot Badge.

Originally known as the Aeronaut Badge, the Balloon Pilot Badge was created in 1918 and awarded to pilots of military observation balloons.  The badge consisted of a balloon centered on a standard Pilot's Badge and was issued in two degrees.  The senior degree of the Aeronaut Badge was denoted by a star centered above the winged balloon.

The Aeronaut Badge was awarded under the authority of the United States Army Air Service and the United States Army Air Corps until the mid-1930s.  The badge was then redesignated the Balloon Pilot Badge and, during the Second World War (WWII), was issued by the Army Air Forces.  Like its predecessor, the Balloon Pilot Badge was issued in junior and senior degrees.

The Army Air Forces also issued a Balloon Observer Badge for those who served as co-pilots and support crew on board military balloon craft.

Due to the aircraft technology advances of the 1940s, balloon aeronautics became militarily obsolete by the 1950s.  At that time, the United States Air Force discontinued the Balloon Pilot Badge; however, the basic version of the badge is still issued by the U.S. Air Force Auxiliary's Civil Air Patrol.

See also
 Obsolete badges of the United States military
 Military badges of the United States

References

United States military badges